Governor Thompson may refer to:

David P. Thompson (1834–1901), 6th Governor of Idaho Territory
Hugh Smith Thompson (1836–1904), 81st Governor of South Carolina
James Thompson (civil servant) (1848–1929), Acting Governor of Madras in 1904
James R. Thompson (born 1936), 37th Governor of Illinois
Melvin E. Thompson (1903–1980), 70th Governor of Georgia
Thomas Perronet Thompson (1783–1869), Governor of Sierra Leone from 1808 to 1810
Tommy Thompson (born 1941), 42nd Governor of Wisconsin
Willoughby Harry Thompson (1919–2018), 1st Governor of Montserrat from 1971 until 1974

See also
Governor Thomson (disambiguation)